The Geena Davis Show is an American sitcom television series created by Terri Minsky starring Geena Davis. The show aired for one season on ABC from October 10, 2000, to July 20, 2001, during the 2000–01 U.S. television season.

Plot 
Sexy and sophisticated Manhattan party-planner Teddie Cochran starts dating writer Max Ryan. The two hit it off, and Teddie soon moves into Max's suburban home along with his two children, six-year-old Eliza and 13-year-old Carter. Motherless for some time (Max is a widower), the two are not exactly welcoming of Teddie. Along with her two girlfriends Hilary and Judy, Teddie must use her unique blend of wits and sarcasm to get through her new lifestyle.

Cast

Main 
Geena Davis – Teddie Cochran
Peter Horton – Max Ryan
Mimi Rogers – Hillary
Kim Coles – Judy
John Francis Daley – Carter Ryan
Makenzie Vega – Eliza Ryan
Esther Scott – Gladys Guevara
Harland Williams – Alan

Supporting 
Katey Sagal – Ashley
Peggy Jo Jacobs as Patrice
Lise Simms as Natalie
Steve Valentine as Walter
Susan Wood as Sydney
Sarah Zinsser as Mrs. Toll
Adeline Allen as Morgan
Dylan Capannelli as Justin
Graham Norton as Bryan Fernando

Production and development 
Terri Minsky first pitched the idea of a Sex and the City-like character becoming a suburban housewife to ABC in early 2000.  After some debating, ABC decided to make the show less like Sex and the City and more tailored to its star, Geena Davis. The show was filmed in Los Angeles and premiered on ABC on Tuesday, October 10, 2000, at 9.30pm. The show lasted less than a season before being replaced by the Joan Cusack sitcom What About Joan?.

Davis appeared on the cover of TV Guide's 2000 Fall Preview issue, along with three other actors starring in new sitcoms: Bette Midler, Michael Richards and John Goodman. Despite the magazine declaring them a "fab foursome", all four series bombed, with Davis' show actually airing the most episodes (20), compared to Bette (16), The Michael Richards Show (eight) and Goodman's Normal, Ohio (seven).

Episodes 
Every episode of the series was directed by Andy Cadiff, except for the unaired episode, "The Wedding", which was directed by Mark Cendrowski.

International broadcast 
In Italy, The Geena Davis Show (known as Geena Davis Show aired on RaiDue Car Hire in 2005.

The Geena Davis Show was screened in the United Kingdom on the now defunct channel ABC1, from the channel's beginning in 2004 until its closure in 2007. The entire series, including the unaired episode, was broadcast on the channel.

References

External links 
 
 

2000 American television series debuts
2001 American television series endings
American Broadcasting Company original programming
2000s American sitcoms
Television series about families
Television series by ABC Studios
English-language television shows
Television series created by Terri Minsky
Television shows set in Los Angeles